Bhagya Abeyratne, also known as Bhagya Abeyrathna is a Sri Lankan environmental activist. In March 2021, she received wide media attention for exposing the deforestation of the UNESCO world heritage site of the Sinharaja Forest Reserve.

Education 
Abeyratne completed her primary and secondary education at the Rahula National School in Godakawela. She completed her Advanced Level examinations in 2020.

Activism 
Abeyratne took part in Lakshapathi, a reality television show aired on Sirasa TV and made revelations about the Sinharaja forest. She claimed that the environment surrounding the Sinharaja forest has been subjected to deforestation. Her comments regarding Sinharaja were scrutizined the relevant authorities,  with her residence being raided by police officers to record statements of her remarks. The government officials denied the allegations made by Abeyratne and also threatened her to not involve regarding the issue without knowing the actual facts.

She also became a talking point on social media and was compared to Swedish environmental activist Greta Thunberg. Several activists urged the government to stop the investigation and the continued harassment targeting Abeyratne.

References 

2002 births
Living people
Sri Lankan women activists
Sri Lankan women environmentalists
Sri Lankan environmentalists